Taylor Grant Williams (born July 21, 1991) is an American professional baseball pitcher in the Seattle Mariners organization. He made his Major League Baseball (MLB) debut with the Milwaukee Brewers in 2017 and has also played for the Mariners, San Diego Padres, and Miami Marlins.

Amateur career
Williams attended Camas High School in Camas, Washington. He played for the school's baseball team, and graduated in 2010. Camas reached the state championship game in 2010. He won the most valuable player trophy at an all-state series.

Williams enrolled at Washington State University, and played college baseball for the Washington State Cougars baseball team in his freshman year. In 2012, Taylor pitched collegiate summer baseball for the Cowlitz Black Bears of the West Coast League. Discontented with Washington State, he transferred to Mount Hood Community College, a junior college. He then played collegiate summer baseball for the Keene Swamp Bats of the New England Collegiate Baseball League, where he had three members of the Kent State Golden Flashes baseball team as his teammates. Based on their recommendations, he transferred to Kent State University to play for the Golden Flashes. With the Golden Flashes, Williams pitched to a 10-1 win–loss record with a 2.47 earned run average and 110 strikeouts. He was named to the Mid-American Conference's first-team.

Professional career

Milwaukee Brewers
The Milwaukee Brewers selected Williams in the fourth round, with the 122nd overall selection, of the 2013 MLB Draft. He signed with the Brewers, receiving a $400,000 signing bonus.

After signing, the Brewers assigned Williams to the Helena Brewers of the Rookie-level Pioneer League. In 12 games (six starts) for Helena, he was 3-1 with a 4.25 ERA. He began 2014 with the Wisconsin Timber Rattlers of the Class A Midwest League before being promoted to the Brevard County Manatees of the Class A-Advanced Florida State League. In 27 games (17 starts) between the two teams, he pitched to a 9-3 record and 2.72 ERA. Williams missed the 2015 and 2016 seasons while recovering from Tommy John surgery.

The Brewers added Williams to their 40-man roster following the 2016 season. He played for the Biloxi Shuckers of the Class AA Southern League in 2017 where he compiled a 0-2 record and 3.09 ERA in 22 games (14 starts).

Williams was recalled from Biloxi on September 1, 2017, and he made his major league debut on September 6. In 4.2 innings pitched for Milwaukee, he compiled a 1.93 ERA. In 2018, Williams began the season with the Colorado Springs Sky Sox and was recalled by Milwaukee on April 8. In 2019 for Milwaukee, Williams recorded a ghastly 9.82 ERA over 12 appearances.

Seattle Mariners
On February 21, 2020, Williams was claimed off waivers by the Seattle Mariners.

San Diego Padres
On August 31, 2020, Williams was traded to the San Diego Padres in exchange for Matt Brash. Williams finished the 2020 season with a 6.14 ERA and 20 strikeouts in 14.2 innings pitched across 15 appearances between the Mariners and Padres.

On June 5, 2021, Williams was placed on the 60-day injured list with right knee inflammation. Williams pitched 5 1/3 innings in 2021 for the Padres, giving up 1 run. On September 3, 2021, Williams was designated for assignment by the Padres.

Miami Marlins
Williams was claimed off waivers by the Miami Marlins on September 6, 2021. Williams made 6 appearances for the Marlins, posting a 7.11 ERA with 3 strikeouts. On September 22, Williams was designated for assignment by the Marlins. On September 27, Williams elected free agency.

San Francisco Giants
On March 20, 2022, Williams signed a minor league contract with the San Francisco Giants. He was released on July 18, 2022.

Seattle Mariners (second stint)
On July 22, 2022, Williams signed a minor league deal with the Seattle Mariners. Pitching for the Triple-A Tacoma Rainiers, he was 2-1 with one save and a 1.14 ERA in  innings. 

On January 30, 2023, Williams re-signed with the Mariners on a  minor league contract that included an invitation to spring training.

References

External links

	
1991 births
Living people
Sportspeople from Vancouver, Washington
People from Camas, Washington
Baseball players from Washington (state)
Major League Baseball pitchers
Milwaukee Brewers players
Seattle Mariners players
San Diego Padres players
Miami Marlins players
Washington State Cougars baseball players
Mt. Hood Saints baseball players
Kent State Golden Flashes baseball players
Helena Brewers players
Wisconsin Timber Rattlers players
Brevard County Manatees players
Biloxi Shuckers players
San Antonio Missions players
El Paso Chihuahuas players
Sacramento River Cats players
Tacoma Rainiers players